Macrocheilus scapularis is a species of ground beetle in the subfamily Anthiinae. It was described by Reiche in 1843.

References

Anthiinae (beetle)
Beetles described in 1843